Ferdinand Christoph Oetinger (18 February 1719 – 15 April 1772) was a German physician.

He studied philosophy at the University of Tübingen and medicine at the Universities of Leipzig and Halle, obtaining his doctorate at the latter institution in 1739. He later practiced medicine in Stuttgart and Urach, and in 1760 was named an associate professor of medicine at the University of Tübingen. In 1762 he became a full professor of medicine at Tübingen.

Published works 
"", 1739 (advisor Michael Alberti), graduate thesis at Halle.
"", 1760 (with Christian Gottlieb Reuss).
"", 1762 (with Samuel Gottlieb Gmelin).
"", 1766 (with Wilhelm Gottfried Ploucquet, respondent).
"", 1767 (with Christian Friedrich Jaeger).
"", 1768 (with Johann Friedrich Gmelin, respondent).
"", 1768 (with Gottlieb Conrad Christian Storr, respondent).
"", 1770 (with Wolfgang Heinrich Moser, respondent).

References 

1719 births
1772 deaths
People from Göppingen
18th-century German physicians
Academic staff of the University of Tübingen
University of Tübingen alumni
University of Halle alumni
Leipzig University alumni